Trinity  is the third and final album by Revolution Renaissance, released on 24 September 2010.

Track listing
"Marching with the Fools"  - 5:07
"Falling to Rise" - 4:12
"A Lot Like Me" - 4:32
"The World Doesn`t Get to Me" - 4:24
"Crossing the Rubicon" - 5:18
"Just Let It Rain" - 4:34
"Dreamchild" - 4:30
"Trinity" - 10:16
"Frozen Winter Heart" - 4:27

Line Up
Timo Tolkki - guitar (2008–2010)
Gus Monsanto - vocals (2008–2010)
Bruno Agra - drums (2008–2010)
Magnus Rosén - bass (2009–2010)
Bob Katsionis - Keyboards (2010)

Reception

References

2010 albums
Revolution Renaissance albums
Napalm Records albums